"Mascara" is the second single released by Australian rock band Killing Heidi from their debut album, Reflector (2000). It was released on 11 October 1999, when their debut single, "Weir", was still on the Australian Singles Chart. The re-release of the "Mascara" single was issued with "Leave Me Alone" as its B-side; it was this version that topped the Australian chart, becoming Killing Heidi's only number-one hit in their native country. "Mascara" was later released in the United States.

In January 2018, as part of Triple M's "Ozzest 100", the 'most Australian' songs of all time, "Mascara" was ranked number 90.

Chart performance
The original two-track release of "Mascara" debuted on 10 November 1999 at number 47 on the ARIA Singles Chart. After seven weeks, it peaked at number three. On 2 January 2000, the deluxe single debuted at number one and stayed there for a further three weeks. After a combined total of 23 weeks, it exited the top 50. The two songs were certified platinum by the Australian Recording Industry Association for shipping over 70,000 copies.

Music video
The music video for "Mascara" was recorded and released in 2000. It is directed by Paul Kosky. A music video was not filmed for "Leave Me Alone".

Track listings
Australian original release
 "Mascara" (radio edit)
 "Superstar" (acoustic mix)
 "Katrina" (acoustic mix)

"Mascara" / "Leave Me Alone"
 "Mascara" (radio edit)
 "Leave Me Alone" (radio mix)
 "Weir" (acoustic mix)
 "Superstar" (acoustic mix)
 "Weir" (radio mix)

Charts

Weekly charts

Year-end charts

Certification

Release history

References

1999 singles
1999 songs
Killing Heidi songs
Number-one singles in Australia
Songs written by Ella Hooper
Songs written by Jesse Hooper
Universal Records singles